"The Mango" is the 65th episode of the sitcom Seinfeld. It aired on September 16, 1993, and is the premiere of the show's fifth season. Larry David said that a friend of his came up with the setup of this episode: Elaine never having orgasms with Jerry. The revelation leads George to suspect his own girlfriend is faking her orgasms, while Kramer is solely concerned with getting fruit from a fruit stand that he has just been banned from.

Plot
In Monk's Café, George tells Jerry about his lack of confidence in bed with his new girlfriend Karen, and entertains the possibility that she is faking her orgasms. Elaine mentions that she faked all her orgasms while she and Jerry were dating. Jerry is flabbergasted at this revelation.

Kramer takes a bite out of a bad peach, which he tries to return to the store where he bought it. This leads to him being banned from the store after he insults the owner, Joe.

Meanwhile, Jerry begs Elaine to give him another shot at giving her an orgasm, which she rebuffs in the belief that sex will ruin their friendship. This causes Jerry to become bitter and resentful toward Elaine.

George becomes so obsessed with his performance in bed with Karen that he experiences what seems to be erectile dysfunction. Kramer asks Jerry to buy fruit in his place at Joe’s store. Jerry is banned when Joe realizes he is shopping for Kramer. George winds up buying fruit for both Kramer and Jerry. George tastes one of Kramer’s mangoes, which causes an erotic transformation, prompting him to race to Karen's apartment. Though he impresses her with his sexual performance, Karen throws George out of her apartment when he ridicules her vocalizations during orgasm, incorrectly assuming she was faking.

Elaine agrees to have sex with Jerry after concluding they have to do it to save the friendship. However, Jerry again fails to give her an orgasm, and blames George. Elaine then asks: "Y'know, I'm a little hungry. You wouldn't happen to have any of that mango left?" Jerry then realizes his solution.

Production

"The Mango" was written by Larry David and Lawrence H. Levy. A friend of his came up with the setup of the episode: Elaine never having orgasms with Jerry. Larry David said that the idea was "too good to pass up." The subplot in which Kramer is banned from a fruit shop is based on one of David’s personal experiences, where he himself was banned from a fruit shop for squeezing the produce too much.

The episode's working title was "The Orgasm." It was first read by its cast on August 11, 1993, at 10:30 a.m. to much anticipation, as it was to premiere in a new 9:00 timeslot. NBC officials, however, were a bit more apprehensive because it was taking over the timeslot of the highly successful sitcom Cheers. The episode was filmed in front of a live studio audience on Tuesday, August 17, 1993.

The exterior shot of Joe’s fruit shop was filmed on the backlot of CBS Studio center. The name "Almo's bar and grill" can be spotted on the storefront next door to Joe’s. This is a reference to the father of Seinfeld set designer Tom Azzari, whose name is Almo.

Reception
This episode gained a Nielsen rating of 19.3 and an audience share of 29, meaning that 19.3% of American households watched the episode, and 29% of all televisions in use at the time were tuned into it.

Awards and nominations

The Mango received the following awards/nominations:

1994 Primetime Emmy Award for Outstanding Individual Achievement in Writing in a Comedy Series nomination: Larry David and Lawrence H. Levy.
1994 Primetime Emmy Award for Outstanding Individual Achievement in Directing in a Comedy Series nomination: Tom Cherones.
1993 Directors Guild of America Award for Outstanding Directorial Achievement in a Comedy Series nomination: Tom Cherones.
1995 Writers Guild Award for an Episodic Comedy: Larry David and Lawrence H. Levy.

References

External links

"The Mango" on Sony Pictures

Seinfeld (season 5) episodes
1993 American television episodes
Television episodes written by Larry David